Vombatus  is a genus of marsupial that contains a single living species, the common wombat (Vombatus ursinus).

The recently extinct Hackett's wombat (Vombatus hacketti) is also a member of this genus.

References

Mammal genera with one living species
Marsupial genera
Taxa named by Étienne Geoffroy Saint-Hilaire
Vombatiforms